The 1948 SMU Mustangs football team represented the Southern Methodist University (SMU) as a member of the during Southwest Conference during the 1948 college football season. Led by 11th-year head coach Matty Bell, the Mustangs compiled an overall record of 9–1–1 with a mark of 5–0–1 in conference play, winning the SWC title. SMU was invited to the Cotton Bowl Classic, where they defeated Oregon. Junior Doak Walker was awarded the Heisman Trophy. Walker established several other SWC records that still stand.

Schedule

Awards and honors
 Doak Walker, Heisman Trophy, All-America selection

Team players drafted into the NFL

References

SMU
SMU Mustangs football seasons
Southwest Conference football champion seasons
Cotton Bowl Classic champion seasons
SMU Mustangs football